Simone Hines is the only studio album by American contemporary R&B singer Simone Hines, released September 16, 1997 via Epic Records. It did not chart in the United States, but the lead single "Yeah! Yeah! Yeah!" peaked at #38 on the Billboard R&B chart.

In addition to original songs, the album contains a cover of "Best of My Love" by The Emotions.

Track listing

References

External links
 
 

1997 debut albums
Contemporary R&B albums by American artists
Epic Records albums